The 2011–12 Coupe de France Féminine was the 11th edition of the French cup competition for women. This was the inaugural edition of the competition under the name Coupe de France Féminine, as for the past decade, it was played under the name Challenge de France. The defending champions were Saint-Étienne who defeated Montpellier 3–2 on penalties in the 2010–11 edition of the final. The competition was organized by the French Football Federation and is open to all women's French football clubs in France.  On 13 May 2012, Lyon earned its fourth Coupe de France Féminine title after defeating rivals Montpellier 2–1 in the final match, which was played at the Stade Jacques Rimbault in Bourges.

Calendar 

On 25 August 2011, the French Football Federation announced the calendar for the Coupe de France Féminine.

First round 
The draw for the first round of the Coupe de France Féminine was held on 19 December 2011 at the headquarters of the French Football Federation in Paris. The draw was conducted by current French women's national team manager Bruno Bini and women's international and Paris Saint-Germain player Laure Lepailleur. The matches were contested on 8–9 January 2012. The postponed matches were played on 15 January.

Second round 
The draw for the second round of the Coupe de France Féminine was held on 11 January 2012 at the headquarters of the French Football Federation in Paris. The draw was conducted by the former Miss France and Miss Europe Alexandra Rosenfeld and French journalist David Astorga. The matches were played on 29 January.

Round of 32 
The draw for the Round of 32 of the Coupe de France Féminine was held on 1 February 2012 at the headquarters of the French Football Federation in Paris. The draw was conducted by television host Julie Raynaud and former French international Grégory Coupet. The matches were played through 19–22 February.

Round of 16 
The draw for the Round of 16 of the Coupe de France Féminine was held on 27 February 2012 at the headquarters of the French Football Federation in Paris. The draw was conducted by federation president Noël Le Graët. The matches were played on 11 March.

Quarter-finals 

The draw for the quarter-finals and semi-finals of the Coupe de France Féminine was held on 21 March 2012 at the Place Marcel Plaisant in Bourges. The draw was conducted by the president of the Ligue du Football Amateur (LFA) Bernard Barbet.

Semi-finals

Final

References

External links 
 Official site 

2011–12 domestic association football cups
2011–12 in French women's football
Coupe de France Féminine